Professor Wendell Horton (born February 1942) is a Professor of Physics at the University of Texas at Austin and a student of plasma physics.  Horton's core area of research is plasma transport and its application to the development of nuclear fusion power. Horton is a fellow of the American Physical Society.

Biography
Claude Wendell Horton Jr. was born in Houston, Texas, the son of Claude Wendell Horton Sr. who was one of the principal contributors to the development of the Department of Physics at the University of Texas, Austin.   Horton attended Austin High School (Austin, Texas) where he met Elisabeth Alice Becker in a physics class.  Elisabeth is the daughter of Ernst D. Becker, a cotton trader, who had immigrated to Texas from Germany in 1927.  Elisabeth and Wendell were married shortly after graduation from the University of Texas, Austin.   Elisabeth and Wendell have two children Mike A. Horton and John W. Horton.

Scientific research
Horton's interest in nuclear fusion grew during his graduate studies at the University of California at San Diego.  Horton was inspired by the enormous potential of controlled fusion reactions to generate cheap, clean, and sustainable Energy on an unprecedented and inexhaustible scale i.e., human generated ‘Star Power’.  Horton earned his PhD at UCSD under Marshall Rosenbluth, a scientist who had worked on the Manhattan Project and a close protégé of Edward Teller.   Horton has published or edited thirteen books on the theoretical basis for plasma containment and transport, and co-authored over 200 papers.   A frequently cited book is “Chaos and Structures in Nonlinear Plasmas” .

Beginning in 1987, due to significant declines in US government funding of fusion research as a potential alternative energy source,  Horton began to pursue research in space weather and the prediction of solar storms using chaos and plasma theory to model the magnetosphere.  The magnetosphere is characterized by an extremely collisionless plasma making available new plasma transport regimes well beyond those existing in laboratory plasmas.  Solar storm prediction has application for improving the reliability of communication and GPS satellite systems.

However, the quest for fusion containment in a laboratory has been the biggest source of contribution and inspiration during his 40-year career in theoretical physics.   Recently Horton has focused on research in support of international fusion experiments including the ITER and Gamma10 fusion machines.

External links
 Wendell Horton UT Homepage

Book by Wendell Horton: Turbulent Transport in Magnetized Plasmas

1942 births
Living people
21st-century American physicists
American nuclear physicists
University of Texas at Austin faculty
People from Houston